Mulo or MULO may refer to:

 Mulo (woreda), a woreda (administrative division) of Ethiopia
 Luis Padrón (1878-1939), Cuban baseball player nicknamed "El Mulo"
 Mulo, a non-alcoholic beverage sold by the George Muehlebach Brewing Company during Prohibition
 Mulo Lighthouse - see List of lighthouses in Croatia
 Meer Uitgebreid Lager Onderwijs, a school form in the Netherlands until 1968
 Memorial Union Labor Organization, a University of Wisconsin-Madison labor union 
Meer Uitgebreid Lager Onderwijs or MULO, a level of education in the Dutch East Indies

See also
 Mullo (disambiguation)